|}

This is a list of Legislative Council results for the Victorian 1976 state election. 22 of the 40 seats were contested.

Results by province

Ballarat

Bendigo

Boronia

Central Highlands 

 Two party preferred vote was estimated.

Chelsea

Doutta Galla

East Yarra

Geelong

Gippsland

Higinbotham

Melbourne

Melbourne North

Melbourne West

Monash

North Eastern 

 Two party preferred vote was estimated.

North Western 

 Two candidate preferred vote was estimated.

Nunawading

South Eastern

Templestowe

Thomastown

Waverley

Western

See also 

 1976 Victorian state election
 Candidates of the 1976 Victorian state election
 Members of the Victorian Legislative Council, 1976–1979

References 

Results of Victorian state elections
1970s in Victoria (Australia)